Grand Strand Airport  is a county-owned, public-use airport located one nautical mile (1.85 km) northwest of the central business district of North Myrtle Beach, in Horry County, South Carolina, United States. The name Grand Strand refers to a nearby 60-mile stretch of beach; its code CRE refers to nearby Crescent Beach.

This airport is included in the FAA's National Plan of Integrated Airport Systems (2009–2013), which categorizes it as a general aviation airport.

Facilities and aircraft
It has one runway designated 5/23 with an asphalt surface measuring 5,997 by 100 feet (1,828 x 30 m).

For the 12-month period ending October 30, 2008, the airport had 46,670 aircraft operations, an average of 127 per day: 96% general aviation, 2% air taxi, and 2% military. At that time there were 47 aircraft based at this airport: 81% single-engine, 15% multi-engine, 2% jet and 2% helicopter.

History
The origins of the airport are undetermined; however, it was likely built during World War II  by the United States Army Air Forces.  Known as Wampee Flight Strip, it was used as an auxiliary landing airfield for Myrtle Beach Army Airfield.  It was closed after World War II, and was turned over for local government use by the War Assets Administration (WAA).

Beginning in 1956, this was the commercial airport for Myrtle Beach and other Grand Strand communities, primarily being serviced by Piedmont Airlines.  It was used until the opening of what is now Myrtle Beach International Airport in 1976 at Myrtle Beach AFB.

Since 1976, the airport has been used by general aviation, primarily serving the North Myrtle Beach area.

See also

 South Carolina World War II Army Airfields

References

 Shaw, Frederick J. (2004), Locating Air Force Base Sites History's Legacy, Air Force History and Museums Program, United States Air Force, Washington DC, 2004.

External links
 Ramp 66, the fixed-base operator (FBO)
 Aerial photo as of 28 February 1999 from USGS The National Map
 
 

Airports in South Carolina
Transportation in Horry County, South Carolina
Buildings and structures in Horry County, South Carolina
Flight Strips of the United States Army Air Forces
Airfields of the United States Army Air Forces in South Carolina